The Bu Maher Fort (sometimes called Abu Maher Fort) is a fort situated in Halat Bu Maher, in the Kingdom of Bahrain. In 2012, the fort was identified as part of the Bahrain pearling trail, a UNESCO World Heritage Site.

History
The fort was constructed in 1840 although its origins likely come from a Portuguese fortification from the 16th century. An analysis of artefacts from the fort by an excavation team from Oxford Brookes University have suggested the site may have been first occupied from the Umayyad or early Abbasid era. There was also evidence of the site periodically being submerged underwater. The rectangular fort with four circular towers was built by Abdullah bin Ahmed Al Khalifa and served as a sister fort to Arad Fort, guarding the passageway of Muharraq Bay. In 1868, the fort was destroyed by British warships intervening in the Qatari–Bahraini War.

The island and fort were partially restored in 1930 to serve as a quarantine station for smallpox. The fort was further reconstructed in the 1970s by a Bahraini archaeological team and further archaeological excavations have since been conducted as recently as 2010. At present, the fort consists of a solitary tower.

Today
The site is now adjacent a coast guard base and can be visited from the Bahrain National Museum by a short boat ride.  The fort currently boasts a visitor centre and is the starting point of the pearling trail.

See also
Bahrain pearling trail
Arad Fort

Citations

Bibliography

Forts in Bahrain